Joaquín Sánchez (5 February 1941 – 2 March 2020) was a Colombian footballer. He played in five matches for the Colombia national football team from 1963 to 1969. He was also part of Colombia's squad for the 1963 South American Championship.

References

External links
 

1941 births
2020 deaths
Colombian footballers
Colombia international footballers
Place of birth missing
Association football defenders
Deportivo Cali footballers